Grace Kazadi Ntambwe (born 31 January 2001) is a French professional footballer who plays as a defender for Division 1 Féminine club Guingamp and the France national team.

Club career 
Kazadi played football until 2011 at CSM Eaubonne. On 1 August 2020, Kazadi joined Atlético Madrid on loan, helping them win the Supercopa de España on 16 January 2021. 

On 12 November 2021, Kazadi extended their contract with Olympique Lyonnais until 30 June 2023.

In January 2022, Kazadi was sent on loan to Sevilla for the remainder of the season.

International career 
On 13 April 2021, Kazadi made her senior international debut for France, in a 2–0 defeat against the United States.

Career statistics

International

Honours 
 Supercopa de España: 2020–21

References

External links 
 
 
 

2001 births
Living people
French sportspeople of Democratic Republic of the Congo descent
Black French sportspeople
French women's footballers
Women's association football defenders
Olympique Lyonnais Féminin players
Atlético Madrid Femenino players
Sevilla FC (women) players
Primera División (women) players
France women's youth international footballers
France women's international footballers
French expatriate women's footballers
French expatriate sportspeople in Spain
Expatriate women's footballers in Spain